Pozzaglia Sabina is a  (municipality) in the Province of Rieti in the Italian region of Latium, located about  northeast of Rome and about  southeast of Rieti.

Among the landmarks in the town is the church of San Nicola di Bari and the Romanesque church of Santo Stefano Protomartire.

References

External links
 

Cities and towns in Lazio